In the United Kingdom, Ireland, Australia and New Zealand, a betting shop is a shop away from a racecourse ("off-course") where one can legally place bets in person with a licensed bookmaker. Most shops are part of chains including William Hill, Ladbrokes, or Coral. In Australia and New Zealand, they are operated by totalisator agencies In the United States post PASPA, brands like DraftKings, FanDuel and William Hill have a presence. Betting shops include America's Betshop and Betfred.

Scale
In 2016, there were around 9,000 betting shops located in the UK. The number of shops grew rapidly in the 21st century. One street in Newham has the largest number of bookmakers concentrated in one place: 18 on the street and about 80 in a local zone. However in 2020, during the coronavirus crisis, many betting shops closed permanently.

Legislation
Off-course betting was illegal until the Betting and Gaming Act 1960 was introduced, although bets could be placed at a racecourse ("on-course") on any event, not just the races being held at that course. Credit betting by post or telephone was legal because of a loophole in the law of "resorting to a house for the purpose of betting" was taken to mean physically resorting to the house rather than simply communicating with someone there.

Gambling in the United Kingdom is common and not regarded necessarily as a vice but a "little flutter on the gee-gees", but there are strict controls on where and how a bet can be placed (they may not be placed in pubs, for example). The Gambling Act 2005 covers those controls, and the Gambling Commission oversees them.

Until 2005, it was illegal to advertise on the outside of the shop any offer of odds, and most had blank windows. The Gambling Act 2005 relaxed the rules a little, but most betting shops still have covered windows much like sex shops; it is illegal to allow people from outside to see inside.

Facilities
At a betting shop, typically there will be noticeboards listing the racing form for the day's horse racing from trade issues of the Racing Post or a similar equestrian publication.

Most betting shops now offer free tea and coffee to attract punters. They usually have large televisions covering all the events, like an American sports bar. Until 1986 they were not allowed to have live broadcast coverage but the bookmaker often had a small portable television or transistor radio hidden behind the counter. Because punters could not see or hear live coverage, some bookmakers deceived punters by claiming a different result from the actual one, or could otherwise alter the declared starting price. This changed in 1986 and Satellite Information Services was formed to screen live races to betting shops. Greyhound races are now timed to the second on the feed pictures, since a scam that intercepted and slightly delayed the broadcast feed for greyhound races, which typically last less than two minutes. By delaying the feed slightly, an accomplice on-course who had already seen the result could communicate by telephone with one in a betting shop off-course, who would bet on a racing certainty.

The larger chains also operate at sports grounds, where bets are placed using pre-printed betting slips. Winnings from bets placed at these facilities can then usually be collected on site, by post or from one of the high street branches.

Fixed-odds betting terminals
In 2013–2014 there was significant controversy with more betting shops springing up on High streets in the United Kingdom encouraging poor people to gamble, especially to play fixed odds betting terminals. Betting shops are strictly regulated in the number of machines they can have and the payout they can provide. On 27 April 2014, the Government announced proposals to give local authorities more power to limit the number and form of betting shops in their jurisdictions.

A £2 stake limit was introduced for FOBTs in 2019.

See also
 Gambling in the United Kingdom
 Tipster
 Bookmaker

References 

Bookmakers
Gambling in the United Kingdom